Enikkum Oru Divasam is a 1982 Indian Malayalam-language comedy film written, directed and produced by Sreekumaran Thampi. The film stars Mohanlal, Adoor Bhasi, Nedumudi Venu, and Seema. The music for the film was composed by Shyam, Thampi also wrote lyrics for the film's songs. The film was a commercial success and is a landmark film in Mohanlal's career for featuring his first major leading role (hero).

Plot

Cast

Mohanlal as Thutimon Babu
Adoor Bhasi as Ouseph
Nedumudi Venu as Vaasu
Seema as Chandrika
Vanitha Krishnachandran as Swapna
Rajkumar Sethupathi as Hamsa
Nithya as Usha
Lalu Alex as Prathapan
Meena as Pathumma
Kundara Johnny as S. I. Jacob
Poojappura Ravi as Thankappan
Paravoor Bharathan as Chandrika's father
Bhagyalakshmi as Rajamma
Roopa as Molykutty
KPAC Azeez as DYSP John Samuel
Shivaji as Salim
Thodupuzha Radhakrishnan as Mammootty
Vijaya Lakshmi as Muthassi
Master Rajamohan Thampi as Shuppamani
Pushpa as Radha

Soundtrack
The music is composed by Shyam and the lyrics for the songs were written by Sreekumaran Thampi. The soundtrack album was released on 11 January 1982 by Saregama.

Release

References

External links
 

1982 films
1980s Malayalam-language films
Films scored by Shyam (composer)
Films directed by Sreekumaran Thampi